The Pact of Caracas was a 1958 pledge by various Cuban revolutionaries to end the Batista dictatorship and restore democracy to Cuba. The signatories included Fidel Castro as leader of the 26th of July  Movement, before he subsequently consolidated a dictatorship over Cuba.

References 

1958 in Cuba
1958 documents
Cuban Revolution